The Karpino Monastery (Macedonian: Карпински манастир) is an important Macedonian Orthodox monastery situated in the northeastern part of North Macedonia, near the city of Kumanovo (near village Suvi Orah).

History

The main monastery church is dedicated to Presentation of Virgin Mary, it was built of crafted stone in the shape of single nave basilica with apse in form of triconhos, from the 16th – 17th century. The church itself was according to myth erected in the 14th century by Dejan.

The monastery and church has been burnt and destroyed many times, but has always been restored by the inhabitants of villages Suv Ora, Aljince, Drenak and Kanarevo.

A new layer of frescoes was added to the original when the monastery was restored in 1892, however some of the original images are still visible, including Mary with baby Jesus Christ and Tiron and Theodore Stratilat.

The church preserves a valuable iconostasis in which there are 7 original icons (The Great Feasts) from 1606-1607, which were painted by Nikola Zoograf and his students.

It was the most important literary and cultural centre in the Middle Ages for this part of the Kumanovo region. Around 300 monks worked at a time in the monastery and were engaged in copying church books and manuscripts. The monastery served as sanctuary for the first Macedonian school where priests received their education. In the late 19th century, the monks of Karpino Monastery began to form public school, teaching a smaller number of villages children to become literate.

Restoration funded by the Macedonian Institute for Protection of Monuments of Culture is taking place to repair damage sustained during World War II.

References

External links 

Karpino Monastery, vicinity of Kumanovo 

Macedonian Orthodox monasteries
Eastern Orthodox monasteries in North Macedonia
Staro Nagoričane Municipality
Osogovo
Archbishopric of Ohrid